Kaela Edwarads (born December 8, 1993) is an American middle-distance runner.

High school
Edwards graduated from Littleton High School in Colorado. Edward was raised in hometown of Highlands Ranch, Colorado. Edwards placed 11th running 46.92 in 300 m hurdles and 8th in 400 m running 58.52 in 5A in 2010 Colorado All-Classification State Track Meet; won 800 m at 2011 Mt SAC Relays High School Invite, later placed 4th in 800 m running 2:10.73 & 4th in 400 m running 55.74 in 2011 Colorado All-Classification State Track Meet; Dana Gaetani, Grace Brittan, Rosa Hardarson, Kaela Edwards won Sprint medley relay at 2012 Mt SAC Relays High School Invite, later placed 2nd in 800 m running 2:10.61 & 2nd in 400 m running 55.68 in 2012 Colorado All-Classification State Track Meet.

NCAA 
Edwards attended Oklahoma State University and graduated in 2017.

Edwards was a 5-time NCAA Division I First Team All-American, the fourth most in Oklahoma State history behind Christine McMiken '86, Jackie Goodman '89 and Natalja Piliusina '15 and an NCAA Track champion. Edwards holds Oklahoma State Cowgirls school records in the 1000 meters (i), 1500 meters, one mile (i), 2nd place in DMR (11:01.15 - M. Sughroue, C. Nichols S. Camacho, K. Edwards at Arkansas Razorback Invitational 2016) and 3000 m (9:06.27).

Professional
Edwards began competing for Adidas and in Boulder. Edwards was coached by Joe Bosshard from 2017 to 2019. Edwards was among two women who were trained by Bosshard who made it to the Olympics (Aisha Praught-Leer and Emma Coburn. After summer 2019, Chad Noelle began coaching Kaela Edwards.

References

External links
 Kaela Edwards Twitter Profile
 Kaela Edwards Instagram Profile
 Kaela Edwards Global Athletics Profile
 Kaela Edwards IAAF Profile
  Kaela Edwards Profile Diamond League

1993 births
Living people
People from Aurora, Colorado
Track and field athletes from Denver
Track and field athletes from Oklahoma
American female middle-distance runners
American female long-distance runners
Oklahoma State Cowgirls track and field athletes